The table below lists the reasons delivered from the bench by the Supreme Court of Canada during 2005. The table illustrates what reasons were filed by each justice in each case, and which justices joined each reason. This list, however, does not include decisions on motions.

Reasons

Individual statistics

Notes

References
 2005 decisions: CanLII LexUM

Reasons Of The Supreme Court Of Canada, 2005
2005